Anna Anatoliyivna Romanova (born 21 February 1985) is a Ukrainian politician, former Member of the Ukrainian Parliament, member of the parliamentary faction Samopomich Union. Former Deputy Mayor of Chernihiv.

In the 2019 Ukrainian parliamentary election she was #21 on the election ballot of Samopomich. But in the election the party did get not enough votes to clear the 5% election threshold and thus won no parliamentary seats.

Biography 
Romanova was born in Chernihiv. She attended high school in Chernihiv, before enrolling in the Taras Shevchenko Chernihiv State Pedagogic University, which she graduated in 2006, with a degree in History and Social Politics. In 2009 she received a degree in Organisation Management from Chernihiv State Technologic University. In 2014 she finished the course of studies at the President of Ukraine's National Academy of State Administration, obtaining a degree in Social Development Administration.

Additionally, Romanova studied at the leadership school ASPEN-Ukraine and the Ukrainian School of Political Studies (USPS). In 2014 Romanova completed PhD studies on city development regulations. She is an expert in territorial branding and increasing competitiveness of the territories. Romanova publishes extensively in academia in her field of expertise.

Before becoming the Deputy Mayor of Chernihiv in 2010, Romanova worked in management and marketing. Since 2010 she was coordinating City Council policy on tourism, international relations, culture, sport, family and youth. She left this position, following disagreement with the Mayor of the city, who refused to help soldiers in the Antiterrorist operation area.

Since 2001 she has been involved in volunteer activities, in 2008 Romanova became the head of Chernihiv NGO 'Civic Thought'. Since 2014 she is the Chair of Chernihiv regional representative office of the Samopomich Union.

In the Parliament, Romanova became the Secretary of the Committee on Family, Youth, Sport and Tourism Policies. She is the Head of the Sub-committee on Tourism, Resorts and Recreational activities.

Family & Lifestyle 
Romanova has a daughter.

She is supporter of healthy lifestyle and cycling sport.

References 

1985 births
Living people
People from Chernihiv
National Academy of State Administration alumni
Self Reliance (political party) politicians
Eighth convocation members of the Verkhovna Rada
21st-century Ukrainian politicians
21st-century Ukrainian women politicians
Women members of the Verkhovna Rada